Mount Jefferson, also known as Muzzy Hill, is a hill ridgeline located in Worcester County of Massachusetts, two miles NNW of Hubbardston. Mount Jefferson Road passes along the hill crest.

References

Jefferson, Mount (Massachusetts)
Mountains of Worcester County, Massachusetts